Nicolaides is a Greek surname. Notable people with the surname include:

Andrew Nicolaides (born 1938), British-Greek Cypriot surgeon 
Angelo Nicolaides (born 1957), South African Orthodox priest, academic, ethicist, theologian, historicist.
Harry Nicolaides (born 1967/1968), Australian writer 
Kimon Nicolaides (1891–1938), Greek American art teacher, author and artist
Kypros Nicolaides (born 1953), Greek-Cypriot maternal fetal medicine specialist
Nicos Nicolaides (disambiguation):
Nicos Nicolaides (1884–1956), Greek painter and writer from Cyprus
Nicos Nicolaides (politician) (born 1953), Greek Cypriot politician
Nikos Nikolaidis (1939–2007), Greek film director and writer
Steve Nicolaides, American film producer

See also
Nicolaides–Baraitser syndrome

Greek-language surnames
Surnames
Patronymic surnames
Surnames from given names